"The Singer Sang His Song" is a song written by Barry, Robin and Maurice Gibb and recorded by the English rock group Bee Gees, released in early 1968 as a single along with Jumbo. In some countries the song was the B-side of Jumbo but in others they were promoted as a double A-side.

Recording and mixing

This track was only issued as a single and not included on a studio album at the time, so by standard practice at the time, it was not mixed to stereo. The song was recorded on 8 January 1968, the same day the song "Down to Earth" was recorded, which was included on their third international album Idea and "Chocolate Symphony", now included on the expanded version of Idea released in 2007.

The song was unavailable until 1990 when it was mixed in stereo for the first time and extended to 3:19 for inclusion on the Tales from the Brothers Gibb boxset. A remastered version featured on the deluxe edition of Idea released in 2006. Its promotional video was filmed in black and white, which featured a man and woman running in a park interspersed with The Bee Gees performing on stage. It reached #25 in the UK.

Release
Maurice Gibb explained about this song:

The only time Robert was wrong when he said to release "Jumbo" as the A-side instead of the flipside "The Singer Sang His Song." We thought that was going to be the A-side, but Atlantic convinced Robert, and Robert had been convinced by Vince and Colin 'cause they liked playing a bit more bluesy stuff, Robert said 'never again will I let anybody talk me into anything'.

The band's manager Robert Stigwood also explained about this song:

I also now realise it was a mistake to release it [Jumbo] as an A-side in Britain because the public still want big, emotional ballads from the boys.

In a Billboard magazine interview with the Bee Gees, Maurice said of the song, "I love 'The Singer Sang His Song' from way back [in 1968]. But the songs are like our kids, and you feel funny favoring one to the other".

Personnel
Robin Gibb — lead vocals, organ
Barry Gibb — backing and harmony vocals, guitar
Maurice Gibb — backing vocals, bass, piano, organ, mellotron
Vince Melouney — acoustic guitar
Colin Petersen — drums
 Bill Shepherd — orchestral arrangement

Charts

Weekly charts

Year-end charts

References

1968 songs
Bee Gees songs
Songs written by Barry Gibb
Songs written by Robin Gibb
Songs written by Maurice Gibb
Song recordings produced by Robert Stigwood
Song recordings produced by Barry Gibb
Song recordings produced by Robin Gibb
Song recordings produced by Maurice Gibb
Pop ballads
Rock ballads
1968 singles